Terry McDermott (1928 - 14 December 2018)  was an Australian stage, radio and television actor known for his roles in the series Homicide and Bellbird.

Career

McDermott played Detective Sergeant Frank Bronson, one of three main characters, in the Crawford Productions police series Homicide from its 1964 debut until 1966. He left the show due to a disagreement over contracts and concerns about performing his own stunts. His character was killed in Episode 58. In 1969, he joined the cast of the soap opera Bellbird, remaining with the series until 1973. McDermott and fellow cast member Gary Gray produced Country Town, a film based on the series.

McDermott also performed in guest roles in several other Australian series, including Barrier Reef, Division 4, Ryan, Special Squad, Matlock Police, Neighbours, Cop Shop, Prisoner, Holiday Island and Skyways.

Personal life

McDermott married teacher Nathalie Kavanagh in 1956. They had five children and lived in Upwey, a Melbourne suburb. He was diagnosed with Parkinson's disease in his late 70s and died from the disease in 2018 at the age of 90.

References

External links

1928 births
2018 deaths
Australian male film actors
Australian male television actors
20th-century Australian male actors